187 Lockdown was a British speed garage act, comprising Danny Harrison and Julian Jonah. The duo produced one album, with four singles released from it, and remixed many songs towards the end of the 1990s.

The duo also recorded under a number of other aliases, such as Gant, Ground Control, Nu-Birth and M Factor. Of these, M Factor was the most commercially successful, notching up a UK top 20 hit with the vocal version of "Mother".

After M Factor, Harrison went on become part of remix outfit Moto Blanco. Jonah still continues to work as a producer.

Discography

Albums
1998: 187

Singles

As Nu-Birth
"Anytime" (1997) – UK #48, UK Dance #1
"Anytime" (rerelease) (1998) – UK #41

As Gant
"Sound Bwoy Burial"/"All Night Long" (1997) – UK #67

As M Factor
"Mother" (2002) – UK #18
"Come Together" (2003) – UK #46

See also
Speed garage

References

External links
 
 

English electronic music duos
Male musical duos
Speed garage musicians
UK garage duos
Electronic dance music duos
East West Records artists